Jeff Reardon (born 1947) is an American politician and a Democratic member of the Oregon House of Representatives representing District 48 since January 14, 2013.

Education
Reardon earned his bachelor's degree in education from Western Washington University.

Elections
In 2012, Reardon challenged incumbent Democratic Representative Mike Schaufler for the District 48 seat in the May 15, 2012, Democratic primary, winning with 2,782 votes (65.7%), and won the November 6, 2012, general election with 13,967 votes (68.8%) against Republican nominee George Yellott.

References

External links
Official page at the Oregon Legislative Assembly
Campaign site
 

Date of birth missing (living people)
Living people
1947 births
Democratic Party members of the Oregon House of Representatives
People from Kelso, Washington
Politicians from Portland, Oregon
United States Navy sailors
Western Washington University alumni
Working Families Party politicians
21st-century American politicians